A Wish Way is a device that appears in three of the Oz books of Ruth Plumly Thompson, The Royal Book of Oz, The Hungry Tiger of Oz, and The Lost King of Oz.  Two Wish Ways are found in distinctly different locations, both in the Winkie Country.

The dust of the road is able to grant any wishes.  In The Royal Book of Oz, Dorothy Gale wishes the Scarecrow back in her presence.

Betsy Bobbin encounters a Wish Way in The Hungry Tiger of Oz.

In The Lost King of Oz, another Wish Way is found by Dorothy Gale.  She uses it to visit Hollywood, California, where she finds the stunt dummy Humpy (2O2-BE10-B47), uses it to bring him to life, and make a quick getaway back to Oz when she starts to turn from little girl to young lady at a rapid rate.

Fictional objects
Magic items
The Wizard of Oz locations